Fahri Hamzah (born 10 November 1971) is an Indonesian politician and former deputy speaker of the Indonesia House of Representatives. He first became a member of the legislative body in 2004 and has been re-elected twice in the same election district.

Career
After graduating from the University of Indonesia, Hamzah founded the KAMMI (Kesatuan Aksi Mahasiswa Muslim Indonesia/Indonesian Muslim University Students' Action Union) and became its first president in the political situation after the fall of Suharto. Later, he joined the Prosperous Justice Party after briefly working as an expert staff for the People's Consultative Assembly. He ran in the 2004 elections as a nominee for his home district of West Nusa Tenggara, and won a seat. In his first term, he admitted to receiving non-budgetary benefits from then-Minister of Fishery Rokhmin Dahuri, which resulted in his being reprimanded by the body's ethical council (Dewan Kehormatan) and was barred from holding a position until 2009.

In 2009, however, he successfully ran for re-election after winning 105,412 votes, the second highest in the district out of 10 elected representatives. During his second term, he caused a controversy by calling for the disbanding of the Corruption Eradication Commission. Also in the same term, he served as a member of the body's ethical council briefly during the 2011-2012 period.

After placing first in the district for his second re-election in 2014 with 125,083 votes, he was elected as Deputy Speaker of the parliament on 2 October, during which the minority ruling coalition walked out of the parliament building due to a perceived unfairness of the majority opposition placing only their members on the body's speaker positions.
 
On 11 March 2016, he was dismissed from the Prosperous Justice Party for making several seemingly controversial, counter-productive and improper statements (a little bit stupid). In accordance, his former party proposed for another member of the parliament Ledia Hanifa Amaliah to replace him as Deputy Speaker. However, Hamzah is still active as Deputy Speaker as of December 2017. Following the dismissal, he sued his former party, winning up to the level of the Supreme Court which awarded him Rp 30 billion in damages (US$2.1 million).

During the voting of the 2017 electoral law, opposition parties all walked out from the parliament's chamber. However, Hamzah decided to remain, despite his sole opposition to a section of the electoral law regulating a 20 percent presidential candidacy threshold with all other members remaining voting in favor of it.

References 

1971 births
University of Indonesia alumni
Living people
Indonesian Muslims
Prosperous Justice Party politicians
People from West Nusa Tenggara
Members of the People's Representative Council, 2004
Members of the People's Representative Council, 2009
Members of the People's Representative Council, 2014